"Dernière danse" is a 2003 song by the French group Kyo from their album Le chemin. It charted in France, Switzerland and Belgium's French charts.

Adaptations
The song was adapted later by the French punk rock melodic group Zephyr 21 on their album Album de reprises Volume 1 using an instrumental version of a song by Sum 41.

Charts

Weekly charts

Year-end charts

References

2003 singles
Kyo (band) songs
2002 songs